Firouz Abdolmohammadian (born 27 March 1942) or Firouz Mohammadi is a retired Iranian water polo goalkeeper. He competed at the 1974 Asian Games and 1976 Summer Olympics and won a gold medal in 1974.

References 

1942 births
People from Ardabil
Living people
Iranian male water polo players
Water polo players at the 1976 Summer Olympics
Olympic water polo players of Iran
Asian Games gold medalists for Iran
Asian Games medalists in water polo
Water polo players at the 1970 Asian Games
Water polo players at the 1974 Asian Games
Medalists at the 1974 Asian Games
20th-century Iranian people